Dušan Šinigoj (born November 7, 1933 in Dornberk, Slovenia) served as the President of the Executive Council of the Socialist Republic of Slovenia from May 23, 1984 to May 16, 1990. He was a member of the League of Communists of Slovenia and the Party of Democratic Renewal. He was preceded by Janez Zemljarič and succeeded by Lojze Peterle.

References

1933 births
Living people
Slovenian politicians